Phlebia tremellosa (formerly Merulius tremellosus), commonly known as trembling Merulius or jelly rot, is a species of fungus in the family Meruliaceae. It is a common and widely distributed wood-decay fungus that grows on the rotting wood of both hardwood and conifer plants.

Taxonomy
The fungus was originally described in 1794 by German botanist Heinrich Adolf Schrader, who called it Merulius tremellosus. Nakasone and Burdsall transferred the taxon to the genus Phlebia in 1984, when they placed Merulius in synonymy.

It is commonly known as the "trembling Merulius", or "jelly rot".

Description
They have a spongy to fibrous texture, comprising stalkless caps or spreading crusts. The upper surface, white to pale yellow in colour, can be dry to moist, and hairy to woolly; the margin is usually white to translucent. The undersurface, bearing the fertile hymenium, features radiating to wrinkled ridges and cross veins, and often forms pore-like depressions on mature specimens. Its colour is yellowish orange or pinkish orange. The flesh of this fungus is about 2 mm thick, with a fleshy to gelatinous texture and white to yellowish colour.

In Dutch, the mushroom is known as bacon-pork rind mushroom because of the resembling with a piece of bacon. It is inedible.

Habitat and distribution
Phlebia tremellosa is found in Asia, Europe, North Africa, North America, and South America. It is a white rot species that grows on the stumps, fallen branches, and logs of both hardwoods and conifers.

References

External link

Fungi described in 1821
Fungi of Africa
Fungi of Asia
Fungi of Europe
Fungi of North America
Fungi of South America
Inedible fungi
Meruliaceae
Taxa named by Heinrich Schrader (botanist)